Irineu Evangelista de Sousa, the Viscount of Mauá (28 December 1813 – 21 October 1889), was a Brazilian entrepreneur, industrialist, banker and politician. Born to a family of small estancieiros (ranchers), Sousa became one of the world's richest men; by 1867, his wealth was larger than the annual budget of the Brazilian Empire. He was called the Rothschild of the South American continent by the New York Times in 1871. He received the titles of baron (1854) and visconde com grandeza (viscount with greatness) (1874) of Mauá.

At his peak, Sousa controlled eight of the country's ten largest companies (the remaining two were state-owned); his banking interests stretched over to Britain, France, the United States and Argentina. Mauá also founded the first bank in Uruguay (Banco Mauá y Cia).

Sousa, who established the modern Banco do Brasil, is credited with financing much of the Brazilian economy activity in the 19th century, particularly in coffee plantation, and with the construction of the first railroads, shipyard and cast iron metalwork in the country. Sousa commissioned the first telegraphic submarine cable connecting South America to Europe, developed commercial transportation via steamboats on the Amazon and Guaíba rivers, and installed the first gas-fueled street lights in the city of Rio de Janeiro, then Brazil's capital. His fortunes turned around with the decay of the Empire after the Paraguayan War, by the time he died, Sousa had lost most of his wealth.

Biography

Early life 
The second son of João Evangelista de Ávila e Sousa and Mariana de Jesus Batista, Irineu Evangelista de Sousa was born on 28 December 1813 on his father's ranch in the then village of Nossa Senhora da Conceição do Arroio Grande, currently the municipality of Arroio Grande, near Brazil's southernmost border with the Spanish dominions in South America, which at the time was part of Jaguarão in the captaincy (later province) of São Pedro do Rio Grande do Sul. Sousa had ancestry from the Azores region of Portugal. Records show his paternal grandfather, Manuel Jerônimo de Sousa, was the owner of the Arroio Grande sesmaria, that is, a large plot of land given by the Portuguese crown, in 1798.

In 1818, when Sousa was five years old, his father was murdered while camping at night when travelling with a herd of cattle, this deeply affected the family's income. His mother then married again in 1821, but the new husband did not want her children from the previous marriage; Mariana then offered Irineu's sister, Guilhermina, who was only 12 years old, in marriage to a man named José Machado de Lima. Irineu, who was 9 at the time, was taken to Rio de Janeiro by his uncle at the request of his mother. His uncle, José Batista de Carvalho, was the captain and owner of a sailing ship and regularly travelled to India, Portugal and the Brazilian coast, stopping at several of its ports.

Writer Anyda Marchant remarks Irineu might have had two years of schooling in São Paulo, from 1821 to 1823, pointing out, however, that this is unlikely. Another one of Irineu's biographers, Cláudio Ganns, dimisses this entirely, arguing that there is not any plausible indication to it. Irineu had been taught how to read and count from a young age by his mother. Once in Rio de Janeiro, the young boy was left alone, as his uncle once again sailed to India; Irineu was employed in a warehouse, where he worked as a clerk.

Legacy and honors
At a time in which Brazil was dominated by government-protected landowners who prioritized exports in a slave-based economy, Sousa defended free enterprise, liberalism, industrialization and the abolition of slavery. After his death, he was given several honors and acknowledgements:
He is the patron of the Ministry of Transport
The district of Visconde de Mauá is named after him
The Baron of Mauá International Bridge links the city of Jaguarão, Rio Grande do Sul with Río Branco, Uruguay
The day celebrated to the merchant navy in Brazil is on Sousa's birthday, December 28, due to his efforts ahead of the Ponta d'Areia shipyard.

Notes

References

Citations

Bibliography

 
 

1813 births
1889 deaths
19th-century Brazilian people
Brazilian businesspeople
Brazilian politicians
Brazilian nobility